Corazon Cojuangco-Aquino, the 11th President of the Philippines, died on August 1, 2009, at the Makati Medical Center in Makati of cardiorespiratory arrest after being in hospital since June 2009, and was first diagnosed with colorectal cancer in 2008.

The Aquino family declined an invitation by government to grant the former president a state funeral. Her funeral was held on August 5, 2009, and her body was buried at the Manila Memorial Park in Parañaque. She is the first woman and the second President and layman after Carlos P. García to have their wake at the Manila Cathedral.

Health

Diagnosis
In December 2007, Aquino experienced periodic fluctuations of blood pressure, difficulty in breathing, hair loss, loss of appetite and a remarkable drop in weight. Some days after, her physician informed the Aquino family that she had colon cancer, and by mid-March 2008, she confided the nature of her disease to a close friend, Rev Catalino Arévalo.

On March 24, 2008, her youngest daughter, television presenter and actress Kris Aquino, disclosed that her mother began to experience cancer symptoms before 2008, difficulty in breathing, persistent cough and loss of appetite. Her only brother, then-senator Benigno Aquino III, was at her side as she made the announcement. Kris also said that the March 19 result of her mother's ultrasound revealed the disease was primarily due to adenocarcinoma, where the cancer started on colon glands. Her spokesperson, Deedee Sytangco, said that her colon cancer was at stage four prior to discovery. While she had initially been informed by physicians that she had only three months to live. Aquino pursued chemotherapy.

Following the announcement, Malacañan Palace was saddened at the disclosure, while Senators Francis Escudero and Aquilino Pimentel Jr. also expressed their deepest sympathies.

Citizens were shocked because some days before, Aquino had made a public appearance at protests against the Arroyo government. She was known before her confinement to be an avid supporter of NBN-ZTE scandal primary witness Rodolfo Lozada Jr., and actively attended Masses and rallies for him. This included the "Mass for Truth and Accountability" novena that she helped organise, the first of which began on February 25–exactly 22 years after her accession as president at the height of the People Power Revolution. On March 23, 2008, during the sixth "Mass for Truth and Accountability" and the day before Kris' announcement, she was seen attending Easter Sunday Mass in Saint Joseph's College, Quezon City, where she thanked Lozada for "his courage and sacrifices for the campaign of truth."

On March 25 at approximately 18:00 PHT, Aquino was brought to Makati Medical Center, where she was prepared for chemotherapy. Her son, Benigno S. Aquino III, said that his mother would undergo such unspecified set of procedures before taking chemotherapy. Some sources at the hospital said that the former president would undergo colectomy, cardiopulmonary clearance and blood transfusion as prerequisites for the treatment.

Aquino had made some progress in April and her appetite returned. In public remarks made on May 13, 2008, Aquino herself announced that blood tests indicated that she was responding positively to the medical treatment.

By July 2009, however, she was reported to be in a very severe condition and kept in hospital due to loss of appetite and chronic baldness. It was announced that Aquino and her family had decided to discontinue the chemotherapy sessions and other medical intervention.

Death
Aquino died at the Makati Medical Center, at the age of 76 on August 1, 2009, at 03:18 PHT due to cardiorespiratory arrest after complications of colorectal cancer.

Her son, Senator Benigno Aquino III, announced her death to the media at 05:00. The Aquino family was then reported to have declined the government's invitation for a state funeral.

Wake and funeral

Wake
Aquino's casket initially lay in state at the St. Benilde Gymnasium of La Salle Green Hills in Mandaluyong, before it was transferred to Manila Cathedral on August 3. A crowd estimated at 120,000 witnessed the transfer of her remains from La Salle Green Hills to Manila Cathedral. Most mourners were concentrated at the Benigno Aquino Jr. memorial along Ayala Avenue, Makati, where the funeral procession paused briefly while the crowds sang "Bayan Ko".

The Church in the Philippines permitted Aquino to lie in state under the cathedral's crossing, making her the first woman and only the second layman after former President Carlos P. García to be given the honour, which is often reserved for a deceased Archbishop of Manila.

In a surprising gesture of civility, Bongbong and Imee Marcos (the children of the Aquinos' bitter political rival, former President Ferdinand Marcos) paid their last respects at the Cathedral on August 4. President Arroyo cut short her visit to the United States, and attended the wake in the early hours of Wednesday, August 5, where she spoke with Senator Aquino for about seven minutes. The Requiem Mass and interment were scheduled for later that day, which was declared as a special, non-working holiday by President Arroyo.

President José Ramos Horta of Timor-Leste – a personal friend of Aquino – was at the funeral. Also attending the wake was another of the late President's friends, Wan Azizah Wan Ismail, the wife of former Malaysian Deputy Minister and oppositionist Anwar Ibrahim, who wore a yellow tudung for the occasion.

Roman Catholic dioceses across the country held their own Requiem Masses for Aquino, which replaced the initial "healing masses" intended for her recovery. Meanwhile, the government declared a week of national mourning for her death.
As much as 7,000 mourners waited in line at the Manila Cathedral on August 4.

Requiem Mass and funeral

The Requiem Mass for Aquino was held on August 5, and was officiated by then-Balanga Bishop Socrates Villegas with then-Manila Archbishop Gaudencio Cardinal Rosales, along with more than a dozen other bishops and priests. Jesuit priest Fr. Catalino Arevalo, Aquino's personal friend and spiritual adviser delivered the homily.

José Mari Chan sang the poem Ninoy wrote for Cory, "I Have Fallen In Love," as Aquino's casket was borne up the nave of the cathedral. Other songs and hymns performed in tribute were "Sa 'Yo Lamang" (For You Alone) by Piolo Pascual; "The Lord's Prayer" by Erik Santos; "The Impossible Dream" by Jed Madela; and "Pangako" (Promise) by Ogie Alcasid. Martin Nievera and Regine Velasquez performed a duet of "The Prayer", while Sarah Geronimo sang the People Power Revolution anthem "Magkaisa" ("Unite"); "Your Heart Today" by Filipina singer Maria Teresa Abellare Llamedo Cruzata aka Dulce; "Hindi Kita Malilimutan" ("I Will Never Forget You") by Zsa Zsa Padilla; and "Bayan Ko" ("My Country") by Lea Salonga. The artists later joined the APO Hiking Society in singing another song from the 1986 People Power Revolution, "Handog ng Pilipino sa Mundo" ("The Gift of Filipinos to the World"). The Philippine Philharmonic Orchestra provided musical accompaniment for the service.

Aquino's flag-draped casket paused at the steps of Manila Cathedral for departure honours, after which a brass band performed four ruffles and flourishes and the national anthem. It was then mounted onto a Isuzu 810 flatbed truck – similar to the one used for her husband's funeral a quarter century before – that was decked in white and yellow flowers arranged in an eight-rayed sunburst evoking the national flag. An honour guard of servicemen from the three branches of the Armed Forces – Army, Navy, Air Force, and the Philippine National Police – stood vigil as the truck-hearse made its way around Plaza Roma fronting the cathedral, escorted by throngs of mourners.

The funeral process then exited Intramuros at Anda Circle and travelled along Bonifacio Drive and Roxas Boulevard, with the flag flying from Independence Flagpole at Luneta lowered to half staff in imitation of her husband's own funeral procession. The hearse made its way down Quirino Avenue, Osmeña Highway and the South Luzon Expressway, pausing briefly before the Ninoy Aquino Monument in Makati where crowds sang Bayan Ko and scattered yellow confetti, which was also done during anti-Marcos protests and her 1985 presidential campaign.

Aquino's casket arrived at the Manila Memorial Park in Parañaque, eight hours after leaving the cathedral. Her immediate family and close associates rode in a caravan of 13 coaches, while mourners and supporters in black and yellow marched beside the hearse and lined the route, chanting her name and flashing the Laban sign ("fight" made by holding the thumb and forefinger at right angles to form an "L"). The crowd that lined the funeral route that passed through Manila, Makati, Pasay, and Parañaque was estimated to be between 100,000 and 500,000 people.

When the cortege reached Manila Memorial, Aquino was given full military honors, with a two-star general acting as military host and eight, one-star generals as pallbearers. As is customary for a former Commander-in-Chief of the forces, her casket was transferred to a horse-drawn gun carriage for the short trip to the family's mausoleum where her husband Ninoy is interred.

Attendance at the burial were originally restricted to Aquino's family and close friends, but the crowd broke through the security barriers after the last of the convoy's coaches entered the gates of Manila Memorial. Though the crowd was inside the memorial park, they maintained a respectful distance from the mausoleum.

Bishop Socrates Villegas and Rev. Catalino Arévalo, SJ gave the final blessing, and as per the family's request, the casket was opened one last time. The plate glass was removed, and after the priests and the Aquino siblings sprinkled the former president's body with holy water, family members queued to give her a parting kiss. The casket was then sealed, the flag was removed, and a final military salute given, with the folded flag presented to Senator Aquino. The pallbearers then pushed the casket into the tomb to the applause of the crowd, after which mourners placed white and yellow flowers inside. As the tomb was being sealed, the congregation sang Bayan Ko again, followed by several Catholic hymns.

Aquino's grave marker is in the same style as her husband's: a simple, grey marble plaque with her name, nickname, and the dates of birth and death inscribed in black.

Reaction

Domestic
President Gloria Macapagal Arroyo, who was on a state visit in Washington, D.C. when she was informed about the President Aquino's death, called Aquino a "national treasure". She cut her trip short to return to Manila for Aquino's wake. Arroyo also announced a 10-day mourning period for the former president, and issued Administrative Order No. 269 authorising "official acts and observances" to help in the funeral.

Former President Joseph Estrada said that the country has lost a "mother" and a "guiding voice of the people", and described Aquino as "Philippines' most loved woman". Aquino supported Estrada's removal from office in 2001, but the two supported each other to oppose amendments in the constitution since last year. The Senate has also expressed its grieving with Aquino's death; Senate President Juan Ponce Enrile, who along with Fidel Ramos launched the People Power Revolution, asked the public to pray for her. Minority leader Aquilino Pimentel Jr., who previously served as interior and local government secretary during her administration, had "mixed feelings" with Aquino's death, saying "We shall be forever indebted to Cory for rallying the nation behind the campaign to topple dictatorial rule and restore democracy."

An opinion among some Roman Catholics in the country was to push for Aquino's canonisation as a saint of the Roman Catholic Church.

International reaction
President of Russia Dmitry Medvedev in a telegram to President of the Philippines Gloria Macapagal Arroyo stated, "The name of Corazon Aquino is associated with a period of profound reforms and the democratic transformation of Filipino society." Medvedev also noted that Corazon Aquino showed great interest and sympathy to Russia and prioritised the development of Russian-Filipino relations. International figures expressed their grief, with United States Secretary of State Hillary Clinton noting that Aquino was "admired by the world for her extraordinary courage". White House Press Secretary Robert Gibbs said that "Her courage, determination, and moral leadership serve as an inspiration to us all and exemplify the best in the Filipino nation." Other ambassadors also sent their messages of condolence following her death. Pope Benedict XVI recalled Aquino as a "courageous commitment to the freedom of the Filipino people, her firm rejection of violence and intolerance," according to Manila Archbishop Cardinal Gaudencio Rosales. President of South Africa Jacob Zuma called Aquino "a great leader who set a shining example of peaceful transition to democracy in her country." Queen Elizabeth II of the United Kingdom said, "I am saddened to hear of the death of Corazon 'Cory' Aquino the former President of the Republic of the Philippines."

Diplomats from South Africa, Brazil, Turkey, United Kingdom, Iran, Cuba, Sri Lanka, Vietnam, Sweden, Thailand, Iraq, Japan, Saudi Arabia, Venezuela, Libya, Mexico, France, and Pakistan, among others, and the representative of the International Organization for Migration (IOM) attended the wake of the former president.

 – Brazilian Ambassador Alcides G.R. Prates offered his country's condolences to Aquino family and the Filipino people.
 – Canadian Ambassador Robert Desjardins said Aquino has been recognized internationally for her contributions to human rights and political freedoms, values that Canada strongly shares with the Philippines, adding that she will be sincerely missed by the international community, and people everywhere, including the 300,000 Canadians of Filipino origin.

 – Chile's Ambassador to the Philippines Ovid Harasich was also at the wake and hailed Aquino for her important role in bringing democracy back in the country. He said the people of Chile were saddened by Aquino's demise.
 – The Embassy of the People's Republic of China has issued the following statement:

Chinese Ambassador Liu Jianchao also recalled his meeting with Cory in 1988, when the Liu was serving as a junior diplomat under China's Ministry of Foreign Affairs.

 – East Timor President José Ramos-Horta, a long-time friend of Aquino,  broke protocol when he came to Manila to attend the funeral. Diplomats looked down on the gesture for heads of state given the fact that it was not a state funeral. Ramos-Horta braved a downpour and arrived on Wednesday morning in time for the funeral mass at Manila Cathedral. However, he had to proceed to Manila Memorial Park in Parañaque ahead of the mourners because he could not sit for long hours due to the wound he sustained from an attempt on his life in East Timor in 2008.

 – Ambassador Alistair MacDonald of the delegation of the European Commission to the Philippines led the European Union in expressing grief over the death of Aquino.

 – Finnish Ambassador Heikki Hannikainen said that Cory's leadership led to a new era of hope and promise to Filipinos.
 – A representative of the territory's Chief Executive Donald Tsang went to the Philippine Consulate to write in the book of condolences.
 – President Susilo Bambang Yudhoyono of the Philippines' nearest neighbour Indonesia said in a statement he was saddened by the news and offered his heartfelt condolences.
 – Prime Minister Taro Aso hailed Aquino's contribution to friendly ties between the two countries:

 – The wife of Malaysian opposition leader Anwar Ibrahim, Wan Azizah, arrived in Manila on the Sunday of the funeral to pay tribute to former Philippine president Corazon Aquino:

 – President Dmitry Medvedev in a telegram to Gloria Macapagal Arroyo stated:

Medvedev also noted that Corazon Aquino showed great interest and sympathy to Russia and prioritised the development of Russian-Filipino relations.

 – Singapore, in a statement from the Foreign Ministry, lauded her as "a remarkable woman" who worked tirelessly for the betterment of the Philippines.
 – Former President Kim Dae-Jung recounted to the Philippine Embassy how the 1986 People Power Revolution that catapulted Aquino to power inspired similar democratic movements worldwide, including his country's own venture into democracy in 1987 following massive rallies.
 – Swiss Ambassador Peter Sutter said that Mrs. Aquino conquered the hearts of the Swiss people when she visited Switzerland in June 1988.

 – Thailand has sent condolences on the death of former president Aquino who died Saturday after a yearlong battle with colon cancer. In his message to Philippine President Gloria Arroyo, Prime Minister Abhisit Vejjajiva said his government and the people of Thailand have learned with "deep sadness and join the Republic of the Philippines in mourning of the demise of Her Excellency Corazon Aquino."

 – The British Government has extended its condolences to the family of the late President through Foreign Office Minister Ivan Lewis.
Former Foreign Office Minister, Lord Malloch-Brown, who worked closely with Mrs Aquino during her election campaign added:

British Ambassador to the Philippines Peter Beckingham also said:

Her Majesty Queen Elizabeth II also mourns Cory's death and said:

 – United Nations World Food Program Country Director Stephen Anderson said that:

UN Secretary-General Ban Ki-Moon voiced his deep sadness over the passing of former Philippine President Corazon Aquino. Ban paid tribute to the former president for her "exceptional courage and pivotal role in the restoration and consolidation of democracy in the Philippines," which she governed from 1986 to 1992.

 – According to White House Press Secretary Robert Gibbs, President Barack Obama was deeply saddened by the death of President Aquino.

U.S. Secretary of State Hillary Clinton and Former U.S. President Bill Clinton expressed their condolences and said that they were "inspired by her quiet strength and her unshakable commitment to justice and freedom".
U.S. Ambassador to the Philippines Kristie A. Kenney said in a statement:

 – According to the Cardinal Secretary of State, Tarcisio Bertone, Pope Benedict XVI recalled Corazon Aquino's "courageous commitment to the freedom of the Filipino people." He remembered her "as a woman of deep and unwavering faith".

Internet
 On the day of Aquino's funeral, Friendster created a special profile page that allowed users to become a fan of the former president.
 On the week of Aquino's death, she became a trending topic on the social networking site Twitter. Users were also able to add yellow ribbons to their pictures to symbolize Aquino.

References

2009 in the Philippines
Presidency of Gloria Macapagal Arroyo
Aquino, Corazon
Aquino, Corazon
2010 Philippine general election
Funerals in the Philippines
Aquino, Corazon
Corazon Aquino